Tarba (Abkhaz: Ҭарба, Russian: Тарба) is an Abkhazian surname that ranks fourth in the Republic of Abkhazia in terms of the number of speakers. Distributed in all regions of Abkhazia, especially in the villages of Bzyb, Otkhara, Mgudzyrkhua, Lykhny, Duripsh, Eshera, Tamysh, Kyndyg, Myku, Chlou, Baslakhu, Reka and Markula. Representatives of the surname with the Mingrelian pronunciation "Tarbaya" (for reasons of forced assimilation during the reign of IV Stalin) live in the Gal region of Abkhazia, as well as in Georgia. The surname is also common in all cities of the Republic of Abkhazia. The surname is used variously like tarba, atarba, tarbaya, taraa, atraa or as atar and in different countries  (Turkey, Balkans, Abkhazia, Georgia and Russia) are just some of them. After Muhajirism, many representatives of the family settled in Turkey and in the countries mentioned. Notable people with the surname include:

Daur Tarba (born 1959), Minister for Agriculture of Abkhazia
Said Tarba (born 1968), Abkhaz football player
Shlomo Tarba (born 1969), Professor of Strategy & International Business, The University of Birmingham, The United Kingdom, is a British-Israeli social sciences scholar 
Tengiz Tarba (born 1979), Abkhaz football player

Abkhaz-language surnames